Tom Arpke (born February 6, 1952) is a former Republican member of the Kansas Senate, representing the 24th district from 2013 to 2017. The American Conservative Union gave him a lifetime rating of 84%.

Arpke is a Salina travel agent and consultant, and holds a Bachelor of Science degree in microbiology from Florida State University. He and his wife, Beth, have five children including Kellan Arpke, who is a Lieutenant in the United States Navy. Arpke was elected to the Kansas House in 2010 and filed for the Senate race in 2012.

Elections

2009
Arpke was elected to the Salina city commission in 2009, receiving a total of 2,386 votes, winning by 332.

2010
Arpke defeated incumbent Deena Horst in the House District 69 Republican primary on August 3, 2010 by a margin of 1,205-898. Horst was seeking her ninth term. He defeated Gerrett Morris (D) in the general election on November 2, 2010, by 3,733 to 2,106 votes.

2012
Arpke defeated incumbent Pete Brungardt in the Republican Senate primary on August 7, 2012 by a 5,413-4,354 margin. He defeated Democratic nominee Janice Norlin in the 2012 general election.

2016
Arpke lost the Republican primary to Randall R. Hardy, when he ran for reelection to the state senate.

Committee assignments
Sen. Arpke served on these legislative committees:
Ways and Means
Education (vice-chairman)
Natural Resources
Legislative Educational Planning Committee

Major donors
Some of the top contributors to Arpke's 2012 campaign, according to Project Vote Smart:
Kansas Chamber of Commerce, $2,818
Koch Industries, $2,000
American Freedom PAC, $2,000

In addition, a number of contributors gave $1,000 each.

Personal life

References

External links
Kansas Legislature
Project Vote Smart political summary
Tom Arpke
Tom Arpke campaign website

Republican Party Kansas state senators
Living people
1952 births
21st-century American politicians
Republican Party members of the Kansas House of Representatives
Florida State University alumni